Events from the year 1893 in Canada.

Incumbents

Crown 
 Monarch – Victoria

Federal government 
 Governor General – Frederick Stanley (until September 18) then John Hamilton-Gordon 
 Prime Minister – John Thompson
 Chief Justice – Samuel Henry Strong (Ontario) 
 Parliament – 7th

Provincial governments

Lieutenant governors 
Lieutenant Governor of British Columbia – Edgar Dewdney 
Lieutenant Governor of Manitoba – John Christian Schultz 
Lieutenant Governor of New Brunswick – Samuel Leonard Tilley (until September 21) then John Boyd (September 21 to December 4) then John James Fraser (from December 20)
Lieutenant Governor of Nova Scotia – Malachy Bowes Daly   
Lieutenant Governor of Ontario – George Airey Kirkpatrick 
Lieutenant Governor of Prince Edward Island – Jedediah Slason Carvell 
Lieutenant Governor of Quebec – Joseph-Adolphe Chapleau

Premiers 
Premier of British Columbia – Theodore Davie
Premier of Manitoba – Thomas Greenway 
Premier of New Brunswick – Andrew George Blair  
Premier of Nova Scotia – William Stevens Fielding  
Premier of Ontario – Oliver Mowat    
Premier of Prince Edward Island – Frederick Peters 
Premier of Quebec – Louis-Olivier Taillon

Territorial governments

Lieutenant governors 
 Lieutenant Governor of Keewatin – John Christian Schultz
 Lieutenant Governor of the North-West Territories – Joseph Royal (until October 31) then Charles Herbert Mackintosh

Premiers 
 Chairman of the Executive Committee of the North-West Territories – Frederick Haultain

Events
May 27 – Algonquin Provincial Park is established as a wildlife sanctuary in Ontario
September 16 – Calgary incorporated as a city
October 27 – The National Council of Women of Canada meets for the first time
December 18 – Robert Machray is elected first Primate of the Anglican Church of Canada

Full date unknown
The Redpath Library is bestowed upon McGill University
 Canada Evidence Act created
Jacques Cartier Monument (Montreal) unveiled

Sport 
March 22 – The Montreal Hockey Club wins the First Stanley Cup by defeating the Ottawa Hockey Club 3 to 1 at Montreal's Victoria Rink

Births

January to June
January 8 – Jean Désy, diplomat (d.1960)
February 7 – Joseph Algernon Pearce, astrophysicist (d.1988)
April 16 – Germaine Guèvremont, French-Canadian writer (d.1968)
May 5 – J. Dewey Soper, Arctic explorer, zoologist, ornithologist and author (d.1982)
May 7 – Frank J. Selke, ice hockey manager (d.1985)
May 28 – Donald MacLaren, World War I flying ace, businessman (d.1988)
June 5 – George Croil, first Chief of the Air Staff of the Royal Canadian Air Force (d.1959) 
June 16 – Ernest Lloyd Janney, Provisional Commander of the Canadian Aviation Corps (d.1941)
June 20 – Austin Claude Taylor, politician (d.1965)
June 23 – Merrill Denison, playwright (d.1975)

July to December
July 7 – James White, World War I flying ace (d.1972)
August 18 – Ernest MacMillan, conductor and composer (d.1973)
August 21 – Wilfred Curtis, Chief of the Air Staff of the Royal Canadian Air Force (d.1977)
October 12 – George Hodgson, swimmer and double Olympic gold medallist (d.1983)
November 12 – Roy Kellock, jurist and Justice of the Supreme Court of Canada (d.1975)
November 22 – Raymond Collishaw, World War I flying ace (d.1976)
December 8 – J. Arthur Ross, politician (d.1958)
December 23 – John Patrick Barry, politician and lawyer (d.1946)
December 23 – Roy Brown, World War I flying ace (d.1944)

Full date unknown
Parr, artist (d.1969)

Deaths

January to June

January 26 – James Armstrong, politician (b.1830)
February 18 – George-Édouard Desbarats, printer and inventor (b.1838) 
March 18 – David H. Armstrong, United States Senator from Missouri from 1877 till 1879. (b.1812)
March 30 – Jane Mackenzie, second wife of Alexander Mackenzie, 2nd Prime Minister of Canada (b.1825)
April 2 – Eden Colvile, Governor of Rupert's Land (b.1819)

July to December
July 22 – John Rae, doctor and explorer (b.1813)
September 19 – Alexander Tilloch Galt, politician and a Father of Confederation (b.1817)
October 30 – John Abbott, politician and 3rd Prime Minister of Canada (b.1821)
November 9 – Henri Bernier, politician, businessman and manufacturer (b.1821)
December 9 – Charles Sangster, poet (b.1822)

Historical documents

Indian agent reports on Moose Woods Reserve and day school, Assiniboia, N.W.T.

Ethnologist takes part in Dogrib caribou hunt near Great Slave Lake

Unmarried women petition Minister of Interior for land grants

Summer visit to Cap-à-l'Aigle, Murray Bay, Quebec

Mackenzie King joins in on Halloween mischief at University of Toronto

References
  

 
Years of the 19th century in Canada
Canada
1893 in North America